Philadelphia, the largest city in the U.S. state of Pennsylvania, is home to more than 300 completed high-rise buildings up to , and 58 completed skyscrapers of  or taller, of which 34 are  or taller and are listed below. Comcast Technology Center is the tallest building in the United States outside Manhattan and Chicago, and is currently ranked as the fourteenth-tallest building in the United States. One Liberty Place stood as the tallest building in Pennsylvania for over 20 years until the completion of Comcast Center in 2008. Overall, seven of the ten tallest buildings in Pennsylvania are in Philadelphia, with the remainder being in Pittsburgh.

Philadelphia's history of tall buildings is generally thought to have begun with the 1754 addition of the steeple to Christ Church, which was one of America's first high-rise structures. Through most of the 20th century, a "gentlemen's agreement" prevented buildings from rising higher than the 548-ft (167-m) Philadelphia City Hall. Despite this, Philadelphia amassed a large collection of high-rise buildings. The completion of One Liberty Place in 1987 broke the agreement, and Philadelphia has since seen the construction of eleven skyscrapers that eclipse City Hall in height.

Philadelphia has twice held the tallest habitable building in North America, first with Christ Church, then with City Hall. The latter reigned as the world's tallest building from 1894 to 1908, and is currently the world's second-tallest masonry building, only  shorter than Mole Antonelliana in Turin.



Tallest buildings

An equal sign (=) following a rank indicates the same height between two or more buildings. The "Year" column indicates the year in which a building was completed. The only demolished building that would have ranked on this list was the  One Meridian Plaza, razed in 1999.

Tallest under construction

Tallest approved or proposed
The list is mainly based on the status of proposals on the Council on Tall Buildings and Urban Habitat's website, .

* Table entries with dashes (—) indicate that a building's height, floor count, or estimated year of completion have not yet been released.

Cancelled or distressed

Timeline of tallest buildings

Philadelphia has seen few city record-holders compared to other cities with comparable skylines. Although churches, cathedrals, and the like are not technically considered to be skyscrapers, Christ Church, after being surmounted with its lofty spire in 1754, stood as its tallest building for 102 years before being surpassed by the (no longer extant) spire of Tenth Presbyterian Church, which was surpassed by City Hall in 1894. Then, due to the "gentlemen's agreement" not to build higher than the top of the statue of William Penn atop City Hall, that building stood as the city's tallest structure for 93 years; it also held the world record for tallest habitable building from 1894 until the 1908 completion of the Singer Building in New York City.

See also

 Buildings and architecture of Philadelphia
 List of tallest buildings in Pittsburgh
 List of tallest buildings in Pennsylvania
 List of tallest buildings in Camden
 List of tallest buildings in the United States

References
General
 Emporis.com - Philadelphia
Specific

External links
 Diagram of Philadelphia skyscrapers on SkyscraperPage
 Philadelphia Center for Architecture

 
Philadelphia
Tallest in Philadelphia
Tallest